The following lists events that happened during 1975 in South Africa.

Incumbents
 State President:
 Jim Fouché (until 8 April).
 Jan de Klerk (acting from 9 to 18 April).
 Nico Diederichs (from 19 April).
 Prime Minister: John Vorster.
 Chief Justice: Frans Lourens Herman Rumpff.

Events

February
 28 – The FNLA approaches the South African Embassy in London and requests 40 to 50 artillery pieces to assist their cause in the Angolan Civil War.

March
 15 – Rhodesian Prime Minister Ian Smith and senior Ministers visit South Africa for talks.
 19 – The Labour Party wins the second elections to the Coloured Persons' Representative Council.
 21 – The Inkatha National Cultural Liberation Movement (Inkatha Yenkululeko Yezizwe) is founded by Zulu Chief Mangosuthu Buthelezi.
 27 – The government announces that it will consolidate the 113 separate homeland areas into 36.

April
 19 – Nico Diederichs becomes the 4th State President of South Africa.
 30 – The World Meteorological Organization suspends South Africa from membership because of racial discrimination.

May
 6 – The government announces that it will provide all Black children with free and compulsory education.

June
 25 – The People's Republic of Mozambique becomes independent from Portugal.

July
 The Progressive Party merges with the Reform Party, a faction of the United Party, to form the Progressive Reform Party.

August
 25 – The Victoria Falls Conference between Rhodesian Prime Minister Ian Smith and the United African National Council is held in a South African Railways coach on the Victoria Falls Bridge, officiated by Zambian President Kenneth Kaunda and South African Prime Minister John Vorster.
 The first Cuban forces arrive in Angola to join Russian personnel who are there to assist the MPLA who controls less than a quarter of Angolan territory.
 The United States and Zaire  request South Africa to provide training and support for the FNLA and UNITA.

September
 24 – Majors Kaas van der Wals and Holtzhausen, SADF liaison officers, are sent to Angola to assist UNITA.

October
 14 – The SADF invades Angola during Operation Savannah in support of the FNLA and UNITA prior to the Angolan elections scheduled for 11 November.

November
 11 – The People's Republic of Angola becomes independent from Portugal.
 13–28 – In the Battle for Ebo, SADF and Angolan forces clash at Ebo in the Cuanza Sul province of Angola.
 19 – The United States Congress approves the Clark Amendment, ending aid to the FNLA and UNITA.
 25 – A South African Air Force Cessna 185 is shot down south of Ebo, killing pilot 2nd Lieutenant Keith Williamson, co-pilot 2nd Lieutenant Eric Thompson and South African Army battalion third-in-command Captain Danie Taljaard.

Unknown date
 Lillian Ngoyi's ban, confining her to Orlando Township in Johannesburg and forbidding her to attend any gatherings, is renewed for five years.
 The South West African Police Counter-Insurgency Unit, commonly known as Operation K, is launched.
 Operation Polo, South Africa's covert military intervention in the Rhodesian Bush War, begins.

Births
 9 January – André Vos, rugby player
 29 January – David Tlale, fashion designer and businessman.
 2 February – Thinus Delport, rugby player
 4 February – Sthandiwe Kgoroge, actress.
 21 March – Corné Krige, rugby player.
 27 March – Bruce Jacobs, field hockey player.
 16 April – Selborne Boome, rugby player.
 23 June – Sibusiso Zuma, soccer player
 2 July – Stefan Terblanche, rugby player.
 7 July – Louis Koen, rugby player
 17 July – Robbie Fleck, rugby player & coach.
 31 July – Andrew Hall, cricketer
 7 August – Charlize Theron, actress.
 1 September – Winnie Ntshaba, actress.
 11 September – Pierre Issa, soccer player
 16 October – Jacques Kallis, all-rounder cricketer.
 24 November – Neil McKenzie, cricketer
 13 December – Bubu Mazibuko, actress.
 17 December – Tim Clark, golfer.

Deaths
 8 May – Bram Fischer, former South African Communist Party leader. (b. 1908)

Railways

Locomotives
 June – The South African Railways places the first of 124 Class 36-000 General Electric type SG10B diesel-electric locomotives in service.

References

South Africa
Years in South Africa
History of South Africa